The Secret Life of Algernon is a 1997 Canadian comedy film directed by Charles Jarrott. It stars John Cullum and Carrie-Anne Moss in an early film appearance. It won an award at the 1998 Breckenridge Festival of Film. The film is based on the novel by Russell H. Greenan The Secret Life of Algernon Pendleton.

Plot
Algernon is an old man who lives alone, having conversations with a porcelain cat and making things out of bones, for which he boils a neighbor's dead dog. He is visited by an old friend who is dying of ailments and thus commits suicide, leaving a million dollars in a suitcase. A woman claiming to be interested in Algernon's Egyptologist great-grandfather pretends to be in love with Algernon, and he almost falls for it.

Cast
John Cullum as Algernon Pendelton
Carrie-Anne Moss as Madge Clarisy
Charles Durning as Norbie Hess
Hrant Alianak as Mahir Sullyman
Kay Hawtrey as Mrs. Binney

References

External links

1997 films
Films directed by Charles Jarrott
English-language Canadian films
1997 comedy films
British comedy films
Canadian comedy films
1990s English-language films
1990s Canadian films
1990s British films